The Acheson Tunnel is a railroad tunnel in Washington County, Pennsylvania.  Acheson Tunnel has also been referred to as "Taggert Tunnel".  In fact, both names can be seen on the portals of the tunnel.

Acheson Tunnel
Transportation buildings and structures in Washington County, Pennsylvania